Made in China 2025 (MIC25, MIC 2025, or MIC2025) is a national strategic plan and industrial policy of the Chinese Communist Party (CCP) to further develop the manufacturing sector of China, issued by CCP general secretary Xi Jinping and Chinese Premier Li Keqiang's cabinet in May 2015. As part of the Thirteenth and Fourteenth Five-year Plans, China aims to move away from being the "world's factory"—a producer of cheap low-tech goods facilitated by lower labour costs and supply chain advantages. The industrial policy aims to upgrade the manufacturing capabilities of Chinese industries, growing from labor-intensive workshops into a more technology-intensive powerhouse.

Made in China 2025's goals include increasing the Chinese-domestic content of core materials to 40 percent by 2020 and 70 percent by 2025. To help achieve independence from foreign suppliers, the initiative encourages increased production in high-tech products and services, with its semiconductor industry central to the industrial plan, partly because advances in chip technology may "lead to breakthroughs in other areas of technology, handing the advantage to whoever has the best chips – an advantage that currently is out of Beijing’s reach."

Since 2018, following a backlash from the U.S., Europe, and elsewhere, the phrase "MIC 2025" has been de-emphasized in government and other official communications, while the program remains in place. The Chinese government continues to invest heavily in identified technologies. In 2018, the Chinese government committed to investing roughly US$300 billion into achieving the industrial plan. In the wake of the COVID-19 pandemic, at least an additional $1.4 trillion was also invested into MIC 2025 initiatives. Given China's current middle income country status, the practicality of its disproportionate expenditure on pioneering new technologies has been called into question.

Background and stated goals 
Since the 2010s, China has become an emerging superpower as the second largest economy and the largest one on a purchasing power parity (PPP) basis. It faces manufacturing competition from countries with lower wages, like Vietnam, as well as from highly industrialized countries. In order to maintain economic growth, standards of living, and meet the demand of its increasingly educated workforce, China undertook stimulating the potential of its economic and technological competitiveness with MIC 2025, to become a "world-leading manufacturing power." Alan Wheatley of British think tank Chatham House indicated, in 2018, that a broad and growing Chinese middle class is necessary for the country's economic and political stability.

China believes in its industrial policy programs, which it sees as key to its economic success. Its leaders hope that government investment in crucial technology sectors will lead to a strong position in the Fourth Industrial Revolution. The key objective of the Made in China 2025 program is, in a world which it views as increasingly dominated by U.S.-China competition, to identify key technologies, such as AI, 5G, aerospace, semiconductors, electric vehicles and biotech, indigenize those technologies with the help of national champions, secure market share domestically within China, and ultimately capture foreign markets globally.

The Center for Strategic and International Studies in Washington, D.C. described MIC 2025 as an "initiative to comprehensively upgrade Chinese industry", which is directly inspired by Germany's proposed Industry 4.0 strategy. It is a comprehensive undertaking to move China's manufacturing base higher up the value chain and become a major manufacturing power in direct competition with the United States.

Policies 
In order to achieve the stated goals, a number of specific policies have been implemented, including:

 High-tech companies are subject to reduced taxation rates.
 Incentivization of mergers and acquisitions of foreign technology companies
 Increased R&D funding by large manufacturing enterprises
 Direct state-funding of R&D
 Roadmap stating specific targets for factors such as R&D spending share, productivity, digitization and environmental protection

Strategic initiatives 
For better implementation of the policies the Chinese Communist Party also implemented 5 strategic initiatives

 Building Research and Development Centers across China (40 to be built by 2025)
 Development of High-End Projects across all of the key industries
 Sustainable production and worldwide leading green manufacturing practices
 Smart Manufacturing incl. robotics and digitalization
 New materials production to be less dependent

Key industries 
Industries integral to MIC 2025 include aerospace, biotech, information technology, smart manufacturing, maritime engineering, advanced rail, electric vehicles, electrical equipment, new materials, biomedicine, agricultural machinery and equipment, pharmaceuticals, and robotics manufacturing, many of which have been dominated by foreign companies.

MIC 2025 lists the following 10 key industries that the Chinese government targets for becoming a world leader.

Premier Li has indicated advanced standards in industries are absolutely essential to foster innovation and eliminate bottlenecks in industrial development. China has a growing middle class who are demanding higher quality goods and services. Compared with overseas competition, the quality and innovation of Chinese goods have not caught up. Premier Li talks about the quality revolution. This revolves around entrepreneurship and craftsmanship.  It will involve embracing a culture of continuous innovations and refinement in quality of goods produced.

Some companies that have been named as leaders of the key industries are:

Funding and evaluation 
The amount of state funding to support the MIC 2025 industries has not been publicized, but is estimated to be "in the order of hundreds of billions of dollars" of  state funding, low interest loans, tax breaks and miscellaneous subsidies. This amount includes US$2.9 billion for the Advanced Manufacturing Fund and US$20.2 billion for the National Integrated Circuit Fund.

China's investment in 5G is seen as part of the MIC 2025 program. As of early 2020, China had around 200,000 5G towers in use; by the end of the year, it aims to have more than 500,000, with an ultimate goal of 5 million. In its 14th five-year plan, China's National People's Congress approved the spending of $1.4 trillion in 5 to 6 years to build 5G networks, "install cameras and sensors to create smart cities, and integrate this network with industry to accelerate progress in smart manufacturing."

Barry Naughton, a professor and China expert at the University of California, San Diego, questioned whether it is sensible for China, considering it is still a middle income country, to be taking "such a disproportionate part of the risky expenditure involved in pioneering new technologies". He commented that while it does not make sense from a purely economic perspective, Chinese policymakers have "other considerations" when implementing their industrial policy such as Made in China 2025.

Reactions

European Union
A European Commission published report calling for the European Union (EU) to increase its industrial and research performance and to "develop a trade policy that can ensure a level playing field for EU companies in China and for Chinese companies in the EU", in response to the Made in China 2025 (MIC 2025) policy. It recognizes MIC 2025 as being similar to the "German and Japanese approaches to innovation and economic development".

The EU Chamber of Commerce in China said that MIC 2025 would increase Chinese protectionism favouring domestic companies. In a report they have written that the MIC 2025 initiative distorts the market, and that market-based innovation provides a better way to pass through middle-income status than industrial policies. Jörg Wuttke, president of the chamber, said: "Very often these major plans, with lots of money, where government bureaucrats decide who's the winner and who's the loser, end up in tears."

Japan
Japanese commentators note that MIC 2025 has led to growing exports of Japanese high-value goods such as semiconductor manufacturing equipment and production line robotization equipment and see it as a business opportunity, but fear that China may become a strong competitor in the long run.

South Korea
A report by the Korea International Trade Association (KITA) sees MIC 2025 as a step towards Chinese self-sufficiency, threatening Korean exports, but also acknowledges opportunities for Korea due to changing industry demands. KITA calls for a response by improving Korean innovation, preventing brain-drain and loss of intellectual property through mergers and acquisitions, preventing unfair trade practices by China and actively playing into market opportunities that arise from MIC 2025.

Taiwan
Aggressive campaigns to recruit Taiwanese chip industry talent with lucrative offers resulted in the loss of more than 3,000 chip engineers to MIC 2025, and raised concerns of a "brain drain". Charles Kao, considered Taiwan's "Godfather of DRAM" was among those to leave Taiwan for a position in China, spending five years with Tsinghua Unigroup which, two years after Kao was hired, had also recruited Sun Shih-wei, formerly vice chairman of United Microelectronics.

United States
At the start of the 2010 decade, United States policy makers began to make defensive adjustments against China's growing position in the digital world. These adjustments consisted of regulated the amount of imports and exports, regulating financial investments, creating financial sanctions and visa bans. In recent years, the United States has taken a more offensive strategy to compete against China. The United States has inserted themselves into the digital world by increasing their own investments in their research and development fields and also banning the use of certain Chinese made technology inside universities and other sites of academia. The offensive measures to compete with China have been proven to be more effective in slowing Chinese influence over the technology sector. However, they take more time to have a sufficient influence unlike their defensive counterparts. Researchers believe the defensive measures being taken are meant to yield the rapid growth of China in order to allow time for the United States strategy to take place.

The growth of the Made in China 2025 initiative is seen by the United States as a threat to national security. U.S officials believe that if Beijing continues to create a significant gap throughout the technology sector officials in Washington should be concerned about breaches inside government departments and agencies. This has fostered the creation of a process by the United States government called “technological decoupling". The United States is strategically finding different means of separation away from technology originating in the borders of China. This is implemented through establishing restrictions on Chinese goods and services or the creation Made in USA corporations to compete domestically.

Throughout the 2010's, the rise in popularity of the technological decoupling theory has come because of the United States shifted view of China and the Xi Jinping ran regime. In pervious decades, U.S policy makers saw the growth and benefits in China as mutual gains in their own borders as well. However, the unique intensity around Chinese policy decisions in recent years have proven to give a voice to a growing weariness about their future agenda. The United States and China continue to sustain a healthy amount of economic interaction, but how they view one another has shifted to a more competitive level.

In 2018, the Council on Foreign Relations, an American think tank, stated that MIC 2025, with its government-sponsored subsidies, is a "threat to U.S. technological leadership". The Li Keqiang government maintained that MIC 2025 aligns with the country's World Trade Organization obligations. On 15 June 2018, the Trump administration imposed higher tariffs on Chinese goods, escalating trade tensions between China and the U.S. The tariffs primarily apply to manufactured goods included in the Made In China 2025 plan, such as those integral to IT and robotics industries.

The U.S. began individual investigations over Chinese companies participating in the MIC 2025 plan, such as Fujian Jinhua Integrated Circuit, based on concerns over technology theft and national security.

On November 14, 2022, US President Joe Biden and Chinese President Xi Jinping met in person for the first time to discuss future relations between the two nations. The meeting touched on improving bilateral relations between the two nations. However, President Biden released a statement summarizing that they will not attempt to contain Chinese development in the technology or financial sectors. Rather, they will continue to "vigorously" compete alongside China. Biden emphasized his strong opposition against a build up of arms that could lead to the two hegemonies promoting the start of a new cold war.

See also
Made in China
Made in USA
Buy American Act
Berry Amendment
Industrial policy
China–United States trade war
Middle income trap

Further reading 
 
 
BBC (2019) China: A New World Order

References 

Economic history of the People's Republic of China
2010s in China
2020s in China
China